Battista "Pinin" Farina (later Battista Pininfarina; 2 November 1893 – 3 April 1966) was an Italian automobile designer and the founder of the Carrozzeria Pininfarina coachbuilding company, a name associated with many well known postwar cars.

Early life
Battista Farina was born in Cortanze, Italy. He started working in his brother Giovanni's body shop at the age of 12, and it was there that his interest in cars was born. He stayed at Giovanni's Stabilimenti Farina for decades, learning bodywork and beginning to design his own cars.

Carrozzeria Pininfarina and career
He formed Carrozzeria Pinin Farina in 1930 to focus on design and construction of new car bodies, and quickly gained prominence. Only Carrozzeria Touring was more sought-after in the 1930s. His work for Ferrari, starting in 1952, would become his most famous though much of it was managed by his son, Sergio, who ran the firm until shortly before his death, on 3 July 2012. Some time in the early 1950s, Stabilimenti Farina was absorbed into the by now much larger Carrozzeria Pinin Farina.

The last design he contributed to was the 1600 Duetto for Alfa Romeo with Aldo Brovarone, which debuted at the Geneva Motor Show in March 1966. He died less than a month later, on 3 April.

Personal life and family
He officially changed his name to "Battista Pininfarina" in 1961. The change was authorized by the President of the Italian Republic, acting on a proposal made by the Minister of Justice.

His nephew, Nino Farina, was the first Formula One world champion.

Honours and namesakes
 He was inducted into the Automotive Hall of Fame in 2004. 
 The Pininfarina Battista all-electric battery-powered sports car is named in his honour.

See also

Carrozzeria Pininfarina, the company he founded in 1930
Automobili Pininfarina, a subsidiary company

References

External links
Biography at Company's Official Website
European Automotive Hall of Fame Inductee

1893 births
1966 deaths
Automotive engineers from Turin
Pininfarina people
Ferrari people
Alfa Romeo people
Compasso d'Oro Award recipients
Royal Designers for Industry